Hollenbeck is a surname. Notable people with the surname include:

Don Hollenbeck (1905–1954), American newscaster and commentator
Harold C. Hollenbeck (born 1938), American politician
John Hollenbeck (musician) (born 1968), jazz drummer and composer
John Edward Hollenbeck (1829–1885), American businessman in Nicaragua and Los Angeles
Ky Hollenbeck (born 1987), American kickboxer
Larry Hollenbeck (born 1949), American NASCAR driver